The Bishop of Kilmore is an episcopal title which takes its name after the parish of Kilmore, County Cavan in Ireland. In the Roman Catholic Church it remains a separate title, but in the Church of Ireland it has been united with other bishoprics.

History
The see of Kilmore was originally known as Breifne (Latin: Tirbrunensis, Tybruinensis or Triburnia; Irish: Tír mBriúin, meaning "the land of the descendants of Brian", one of the kings of Connaught) and took its name after the Kingdom of Breifne.

The see became one of the dioceses approved by Giovanni Cardinal Paparoni at the synod of Kells in 1152, and has approximately the same boundaries as those of the ancient Kingdom of Breifne. In the Irish annals, the bishops were recorded of Breifne, Breifni, Breifny, Tir-Briuin, or Ui-Briuin-Breifne.

In the second half of the 12th century, it is likely the sees of Breifne and Kells were ruled together under one bishop. In 1172, Tuathal Ua Connachtaig took the oath of fealty to King Henry II of England as bishop of Kells. Soon after 1211 the see of Kells was incorporated into the diocese of Meath.

In 1454, Pope Nicholas V gave permission for the then bishop, Aindrias Mac Brádaigh (Anglicised: Andrew McBrady), to have the ancient church at Kilmore, founded in the 6th century by Saint Felim (or Feithlimidh), to be the cathedral church of the diocese. This building passed into the hands of the Church of Ireland at the Reformation, and, following the construction of a new cathedral, is now used as a parochial hall.

After the upheavals of the Reformation, there were parallel apostolic successions: one of the Church of Ireland and the other of the Roman Catholic Church.

In the Church of Ireland, the title was intermittently held with Ardagh until they were finally united in 1839. In 1841, the sees of Kilmore and Ardagh were amalgamated with Elphin to form the united bishopric of Kilmore, Elphin and Ardagh. The current incumbent is The Right Reverend Samuel Ferran Glenfield M.A. M.Th. (Oxon.) M.Litt. He was elected, consecrated, and installed in 2013.

In the Roman Catholic, the title continues as a separate bishopric. The current Bishop of the Roman Catholic Diocese of Kilmore is the Most Reverend Martin Hayes, who was appointed as the diocesan bishop on 29 June and installed at the Cathedral Church of Saints Patrick and Felim, Cavan on 20 September 2020.

Pre-Reformation bishops

Bishops during the Reformation
During the Reformation, Edmund Nugent and John MacBrady were at one time or another bishops of either the Church of Ireland or Roman Catholic succession. They were each appointed as Roman Catholic bishops, but later accepted or recognized as Anglican bishops.

Post-Reformation bishops

Church of Ireland succession

Roman Catholic succession

Notes
  These two are possibly the same individual.
  Cormac Mág Shamhradháin and Tomás Mac Brádaigh were rival bishops, and probably supported by rival septs within the diocese. They were present at provincial councils held by Ottaviano Spinelli de Palatio, Archbishop of Armagh, in 1492 and 1495, and were both then recognized as bishops of Kilmore. But Diarmaid Ó Raghillaigh was appointed to the see in 1512 before Cormac's death, though Cormac was still maintaining his rights at that date.

See also

 Bishop of Kilmore, Elphin and Ardagh
 Bishop of Elphin
 Bishop of Ardagh
 Roman Catholic Diocese of Kilmore
 Diocese of Kilmore, Elphin and Ardagh (Church of Ireland)
 List of Anglican diocesan bishops in Britain and Ireland

References

Bibliography

 
  
 
 

Kilmore
Kilmore
Religion in County Cavan
Roman Catholic Diocese of Kilmore
Anglican bishops of Kilmore
Bishops of Kilmore or Elphin or of Ardagh
 Bishop